Anton Einsle (1801–1871), an Austrian portrait painter, was born at Vienna 30 January 1801. He studied at the Academy of that city, and was largely patronized by the court and nobility. He died at Vienna 10 March 1871.

References

 

1801 births
1871 deaths
19th-century Austrian painters
Austrian male painters
Austrian portrait painters
Artists from Vienna
19th-century Austrian male artists